Is It O.K. is the third major label album by Canadian singer-songwriter Serena Ryder. The album was released on November 11, 2008 in Canada. The singles for this album are "Little Bit of Red", "All for Love", and "What I Wanna Know". The album won Adult Alternative Album of the Year at the 2009 Juno Awards

This album was certified gold on April 22, 2009.

Track listing 
 "Sweeping the Ashes" (Serena Ryder) – 4:42 
 "Little Bit of Red" (Dave Bassett, Serena Ryder) – 3:30 
 "Brand New Love" (Serena Ryder) – 3:51
 "Hiding Places" (Serena Ryder) – 4:00 
 "Blown Like the Wind at Night" (Jeen O'brien, Serena Ryder) – 3:41
 "All for Love" (John Alagia, Steve Mcewan, Serena Ryder) – 3:57 
 "Weak in the Knees" (Serena Ryder) – 3:40
 "Stumbling Over You" (Mikal Blue, Serena Ryder) – 3:32
 "Why Can't I Love You" (Serena Ryder, Brian Howes) – 3:53
 "Truth" (Serena Ryder) – 3:43
 "Is It O.K." (Serena Ryder, Mikal Blue) – 3:44
 "What I Wanna Know" (Serena Ryder, Jim Duguid) – 3:50 
 "Dark as the Black" (Serena Ryder) – 4:38

(CD ROM track)/multimedia track
 "All Up to You"

Deluxe edition bonus tracks
 "Racing in the Street" (Acoustic Cover Version) (Bruce Springsteen) – 4:12
 "No Air" (featuring The Beauties) – 3:34
 "The Funeral" {featuring The Beauties} – 6:38
 "Slow" (featuring The Beauties) – 2:56

Personnel
 John Alagia – acoustic guitar (tracks 5, 6, 8, 9, and 12), electric guitar (tracks:l 3, 7, 9, 11, and 12), backing vocals (tracks 1, 4, 8, and 12)
 Matt Chamberlain – drums, percussion, loops(tracks: 3, 7, 11, and 12)
 Mark Goldenberg – electric guitar (tracks: 3, 4, 6, 7, 8, and 12)
 Sean Hurley – bass
 Zac Rae – keyboards, glockenspiel (tracks 3 and 12)
 Lyle Workman – electric guitar, banjo (tracks 1 and 12)
 Serena Ryder – acoustic guitar, vocals

Notes

External links
Is It O.K. sheet music songbook at goodnewsmusic
Is It O.K. Deluxe Edition at Amazon.com
Serena Ryder wins at 2009 Juno Awards at Atlantic Records web site

2008 albums
Serena Ryder albums
Atlantic Records albums
Juno Award for Adult Alternative Album of the Year albums